Coleophora zagrosella is a moth of the family Coleophoridae.

References

zagrosella
Moths described in 1994